Michiel Conrad Botha (born 9 August 1972) better known as Conrad Bo  is a South African Artist, the founder of The Superstroke Art Movement.

He was born in Pretoria, South Africa, but grew up in Witbank, about 100 kilometers from Pretoria, where he attended Primary and High School. He studied at the University of Johannesburg where he obtained a B.Com. Degree. After working for several corporate companies he devoted himself full-time to art in 2002.

He has participated in several Group and Solo Exhibitions in various places all over South Africa and is the founding member of The Superstroke Art Movement which are still active in South Africa and various other counties. The Superstroke Art Movement is one of the few Art Movements that exist in Africa, and is only preceded by Fook Island, an Art Movement whose originator was the well known South African artist Walter Battiss.

The Superstroke Art Movement is a direct decedent of the concept of Generalism, and according to Bo, it is also greatly influenced by the Superflat, the Japanese Art Movement founded by Takashi Murakami.

References

Culture Magazine First Edition April June 2005
Blink Magazine Dec Jan 2005, P55 -60. Conrad Botha, Monochrome Painting
Habitat Magazine (South African Edition) July 2007 p67-70. Conrad Bo, Johannesburg in Black and White

External links 
 Information, Paintings 
 Information, photographs of paintings and elaboration on the Superstroke Art Movement

1972 births
Living people
People from Mpumalanga
People from Pretoria
South African painters
South African male painters
University of Johannesburg alumni